Bucumolol is a beta-adrenergic antagonist.

References

Beta blockers
Coumarins
N-tert-butyl-phenoxypropanolamines